Moreno is an Italian given name.

It may refer to:

Moreno Aoas Vidal (born 1983), Brazilian footballer playing for Udinese
Moreno Argentin (born 1960), Italian cyclist
Moreno Ferrario, Italian footballer
Moreno Mannini, Italian footballer
Moreno Torricelli, Italian football player and manager

See also
 Morena (given name), feminine form
 Reno (given name), diminutive form
 Moreno (disambiguation)
 Moreno (surname)

Italian masculine given names